Aristeidis Gournelis (Irakleia, Serres, ? – 1970) was a Greek lawyer and politician. He acted as governor of Evros.

References 

1970 deaths
People from Irakleia, Serres
National and Kapodistrian University of Athens alumni
Regional governors of Greece